The Thulin L was a Swedish reconnaissance plane built in the late 1910s.

Design and development
The Thulin L was a two-seat biplane derived from the unsuccessful Thulin E. It differed from the latter in that the wing surface was increased and the float location was made easier. Four production Thulin L floatplanes were ordered July 4, 1916, and they were delivered from November 1916 to March 1917.

Specifications

See also

References

Biplanes
Single-engined tractor aircraft
1910s Swedish aircraft
Aircraft first flown in 1916